Luka Štor (born 5 July 1998) is a Slovenian footballer who plays as a forward for Bravo.

Career
Štor made his professional debut for Aluminij in the Slovenian PrvaLiga on 20 February 2018, coming on as a substitute in the 70th minute for Ibrahim Mensah in the 1–1 away draw against Ankaran. In August 2019, Štor joined the 2. Bundesliga club Dynamo Dresden.

References

External links
 Luka Štor at DFB 
 Luka Štor at kicker.de 
 Luka Štor at NZS 

1998 births
Living people
People from Šempeter pri Gorici
Slovenian footballers
Association football forwards
Slovenia youth international footballers
Slovenia under-21 international footballers
Slovenian expatriate footballers
Slovenian expatriate sportspeople in Germany
Expatriate footballers in Germany
Slovenian expatriate sportspeople in Cyprus
Expatriate footballers in Cyprus
NK Maribor players
NK Aluminij players
Dynamo Dresden players
Apollon Limassol FC players
NK Bravo players
Slovenian PrvaLiga players
2. Bundesliga players
3. Liga players
Cypriot First Division players